Reuben D. Smart (December 24, 1832 – June 6, 1890) was an American lumberman and politician.

Born in Saint Patrick Parish, Charlotte County, New Brunswick, Canada, Smart emigrated to the United States in 1855 and settled in Manitowoc, Wisconsin. Smart was in the lumber business. In 1872, Smart was elected sheriff of Manitowoc County, Wisconsin and was a Republican. In 1875, Smart served in the Wisconsin State Assembly. Smart served as Manitowoc County judge and was appointed postmaster of Manitowoc by President Benjamin Harrison. He also served as deputy collector of internal revenue. Smart died in Manitowoc, Wisconsin; he had one of his legs amputated by a surgeon in Oshkosh, Wisconsin.

Notes

1832 births
1890 deaths
Pre-Confederation Canadian emigrants to the United States
People from Charlotte County, New Brunswick
People from Manitowoc, Wisconsin
Businesspeople from Wisconsin
Wisconsin sheriffs
Wisconsin state court judges
Republican Party members of the Wisconsin State Assembly
Wisconsin postmasters
19th-century American politicians
19th-century American businesspeople
19th-century American judges